Mathematics Education Research Journal is a quarterly peer-reviewed scientific journal covering mathematics education. It was established in 1989 and is published by Springer Science+Business Media on behalf of the Mathematics Education Research Group of Australasia. The editor-in-chief is Peter Grootenboer (Griffith University).

Abstracting and indexing
The journal is abstracted and indexed in the Astrophysics Data System, EBSCO databases, Emerging Sources Citation Index, ERIC, ProQuest databases, and Scopus.

See also
 List of scientific journals in mathematics education

References

External links

Mathematics Education Research Group of Australasia

English-language journals
Mathematics education journals
Springer Science+Business Media academic journals
Publications established in 1989
Quarterly journals